Kunya may refer to:
Kunya (Arabic), an honorific in Arabic names
Kunya (river), a river in northwestern Russia
Kunya, Russia, name of several inhabited localities in Russia

Kunia may refer to:
Kunia Camp, Hawaii
Kunia Regional SIGINT Operations Center, former US military facility in Hawaii

See also
 Kunia Camp, Hawaii
 Konye-Urgench